Boudina Mustapha is a member of the Pan-African Parliament from Algeria, beginning in 2004.

See also
 List of members of the Pan-African Parliament

References

Year of birth missing (living people)
Living people
Members of the Pan-African Parliament from Algeria
21st-century Algerian people